Tŷ  Glyn or Tyglyn is a small village in the  community of Ciliau Aeron, Ceredigion, Wales, which is 67.1 miles (107.9 km) from Cardiff and 180.5 miles (290.4 km) from London. Tŷ Glyn is represented in the Senedd by Elin Jones (Plaid Cymru) and is part of the Ceredigion constituency in the House of Commons.

See also
List of localities in Wales by population

References

Villages in Ceredigion

cy:Tŷ Glyn